Amanikhabale (also transliterated Astabarqaman) was a King of Kush (circa 50 BCE – 40 BCE).

According to Reisner, Amanikhabale was buried in Pyramid 2 at the North cemetery (Beg. N2) at Meroe (Bagrawiyah).

References

Further reading
  (with images of the king's stela)

1st-century BC monarchs of Kush